These are all the matches played by the Spain national football team between 1960 and 1979:

Meaning

Results
119 matches played:

1960s

1970s

See also
 Spain national football team results
 Spain national football team results (1920–1939)
 Spain national football team results (1940–1959)
 Spain national football team results (1980–1989)
 Spain national football team results (1990–1999)

References

External links
Todos los partidos (all the games) at Selección Española de Fútbol (official site)

1960s in Spain
1970s in Spain
1960
1959–60 in Spanish football
1960–61 in Spanish football
1961–62 in Spanish football
1962–63 in Spanish football
1963–64 in Spanish football
1964–65 in Spanish football
1965–66 in Spanish football
1966–67 in Spanish football
1967–68 in Spanish football
1968–69 in Spanish football
1969–70 in Spanish football
1970–71 in Spanish football
1971–72 in Spanish football
1972–73 in Spanish football
1973–74 in Spanish football
1974–75 in Spanish football
1975–76 in Spanish football
1976–77 in Spanish football
1977–78 in Spanish football
1978–79 in Spanish football
1979–80 in Spanish football